The Royal Mounted Patrol is a 1941 American Western film directed by Lambert Hillyer and written by Winston Miller. The film stars Charles Starrett, Russell Hayden, Wanda McKay, Donald Curtis, Lloyd Bridges and Evan Thomas. The film was released on November 19, 1941, by Columbia Pictures.

Plot

Cast          
Charles Starrett as Tom Jeffries
Russell Hayden as Lucky Lawrence
Wanda McKay as Betty Duvalle
Donald Curtis as Frenchy Duvalle
Lloyd Bridges as Hap Andrews
Evan Thomas as Commander
Ted Adams as Pete
Harrison Greene as Office Manager
Kermit Maynard as Sgt. Coburn

References

External links
 

1941 films
American action films
American black-and-white films
1940s action films
Royal Canadian Mounted Police in fiction
Northern (genre) films
Columbia Pictures films
Films directed by Lambert Hillyer
1940s English-language films
1940s American films